= Mahlkot =

- town
- Location in Kerala, India
- Coordinates: 11°9′55.83″N 75°48′54.32″E
- Country: India
- State: Kerala
- District: Kozhikode

Languages
  - Official: Malayalam, English
- Time zone: UTC+5:30 (IST)

Malkot is a village located in the Jaisalmer district of the Indian state of Rajasthan.

== Geography and culture ==
The village lies within the Thar Desert region of northwestern India, an area known for its arid climate, sand dunes, and sparse rural settlements.

The culture of villages in the Jaisalmer region is strongly influenced by traditional Rajasthani customs, including folk music, handicrafts, desert architecture, and pastoral lifestyles.

The surrounding region is known for traditional desert festivals, colorful clothing, and camel-based transportation practices that historically played an important role in local trade and everyday life. The railway developed from the Imperial Railways of North China during the late Qing dynasty.

Construction of the Tangshan–Tianjin section began in 1881 and the railway network was later extended west toward Beijing and east toward Shanhaiguan.
